Eutudora is a genus of land snails with an operculum, terrestrial gastropod mollusks in the family Pomatiidae.

Species 
Species within the genus Eutudora include:
Eutudora agassizi (Charpentier in Pfeiffer, 1852)
Eutudora cabrerai (Torre & Bartsch, 1941)
Eutudora camoensis (Torre & Bartsch, 1941)
Eutudora catenata (Gould, 1843)
Eutudora jimenoi (Arango in Pfeiffer, 1864)
Eutudora limbifera (Menke in Pfeiffer, 1846)
Eutudora transitoria (Torre & Bartsch, 1941)

References 

Pomatiidae